NVSS 2146+82 (WN B2147+81) is a giant radio galaxy, one of the largest known. At the time of its discovery in 2000, it was the second largest, second only to 3C236. The optical counterpart to the radio object is a peculiar giant elliptical galaxy.

The galaxy cluster in which this galaxy is situated has an Abell richness class of 0 or 1. The cluster members were misidentified when originally surveyed, as part of Zw Cl 2147.0+8155, a background rich cluster.

See also
Active galactic nucleus

References

Radio galaxies
Elliptical galaxies
Principal Galaxies Catalogue objects
Cepheus (constellation)